Richard Brooks "Richie" Broadbelt is a Canadian retired ice hockey goaltender who was an All-American for St. Lawrence.

Career
Broadbelt arrived in Canton in the fall of 1959 and, after a year with the freshman team, became the starting goaltender for the Saints. He helped St. Lawrence capture the Tri-State League championship that season and won the first national semifinal games for the Saints in their sixth attempt. Unfortunately, the 1961 Denver team was one of the most dominant squads in history and Broadbelt surrendered 12 goals on 50 shots in the title match.

The next season St. Lawrence joined with 27 other teams in forming ECAC Hockey and Broadbelt, one of the top goaltenders in the nation, led the team to the inaugural 1962 ECAC Tournament Championship. The win gave St. Lawrence another opportunity to win a championship, but the team reverted to form and lost both games to finish fourth in the tournament. Despite the last-place finish, Broadbelt was named as the best goaltender in the championship. For his final season, Broadbelt continued to improve and was named as both an All-American and First Team All-ECAC while setting program records for both goals against average and save percentage. St. Lawrence finished fourth in the conference but they could not improve their standing in the ECAC Tournament and lost the consolation game.

After graduating, Broadbelt spent a year with the Canadian national team but was not selected for the Olympic team. After retiring as a player, Broadbelt coached briefly, appearing as an assistant for Penn in 1970. Broadbelt was inducted into the St. Lawrence Athletic Hall of Fame in 2000.

Statistics

Regular season and playoffs

Awards and honors

References

External links

1938 births
Living people
Ice hockey people from Montreal
Canadian ice hockey goaltenders
St. Lawrence Saints men's ice hockey players
AHCA Division I men's ice hockey All-Americans